Michael George Anthony Finan (born 11 August 1996) is an English cricketer who plays for Leicestershire County Cricket Club. He is a right-handed bat and left-arm medium pace bowler.

Career
Finan signed for Leicestershire in August 2022 after a short trial. He had previously
played for Cheshire in the minor counties and second-XI cricket for Yorkshire and  Northants. 

Finan made his List-A debut for Leicestershire on the 20 August, 2022 against Nottinghamshire. Finan made his first class debut for Leicestershire on 5 September, 2022 against Nottinghamshire at Trent Bridge. Notts won the match by 241 runs but Finan hit a half-century on debut and his wickets included England international opener Haseeb Hameed.

References

External Links

1996 births
English cricketers
Leicestershire cricketers
Living people